The AMA Scientific Achievement Award is awarded by American Medical Association.  It may be given to either physicians or non-physician scientists who have contributed significantly to the field of medical science.  The award itself consists of a gold medallion. 

The recipients are chosen by the AMA's Board of Trustees, and Physician candidates must be AMA members.

Recipients
Source: AMA Awards 
 1962 – Donald D. Van Slyke, PhD, Upton, New York
 1963 – John F. Enders, Phd, Boston, Massachusetts
 1964 – René J. Dubos, PhD, New York, New York
 1965 – Edward C. Kendall, PhD, Princeton, New Jersey
 1966 – Wendell M. Stanley, PhD, Berkeley, California
 1967 – Gregory Pincus, ScD, Shrewsbury, Massachusetts
 1968 – Arthur Kornberg, MD, Palo Alto, California
 1969 – Philip Handler, PhD, Durham, North Carolina
 1970 – Choh Hao Li, Phd, Berkeley, California
 1971 – Robert B. Woodward, MD, Cambridge, Massachusetts
 1972 – William Bennett Kouwenhoven, MD, Baltimore, Maryland
 1973 – Edith Hinkley Quimby, ScD, Palo Alto, California
 1974 – Philip Abelson, PhD, Washington, District of Columbia
 1975 – Rosalyn Yalow, PhD, Bronx, New York; Solomon A. Berson, MD (posthumously)
 1976 – Harry Goldblatt, MD, Cleveland, Ohio
 1977 – Helen B. Taussig, MD, Baltimore, Maryland
 1978 – F. Mason Sones, MD, Cleveland, Ohio
 1979 – Orvan W. Hess, MD, New Haven, Connecticut
 1980 – Harold E. Kleinert, MD, Louisville, Kentucky
 1981 – Hans von Leden, MD, Los Angeles, California
 1982 – Willem J. Kolff, PhD, Salt Lake City, Utah
 1983 – Maurice R. Hillerman, PhD, West Point, Pennsylvania
 1984 – Maurice J. Jurkiewicz, MD, Atlanta, Georgia
 1985 – Solomon H. Snyder, MD, Baltimore, Maryland
 1986 – George Edward Burch, MD, New Orleans, Louisiana
 1987 – Norman E. Shumway, MD, Stanford, California
 1988 – Harriet P. Dustan, MD, Birmingham, Alabama
 1989 – John G. Morrison, MD, Piedmont, California
 1990 – Arthur C. Guyton, MD, Jackson, Mississippi
 1991 – Henry Nicholas Wagner, Jr., MD, Baltimore, Maryland
 1992 – Byrl J. "B.J." Kennedy, MD, Minneapolis, Minnesota
 1993 – Juan A. del Regato, MD, Tampa, Florida
 1994 – William H. Beierwaltes, MD, Grosse Point Park, Michigan
 1995 – Carl R. Hartrampf, Jr., MD, Atlanta, Georgia; Frank G. Moody, MD, Houston, Texas
 1996 – Alfred B. Swanson, MD, Grand Rapids, Michigan
 1997 – E. Harvey Estes, MD, Raleigh, North Carolina
 1998 – Charles S. Lieber, MD, Bronx, New York
 1999 – no listed recipient
 2000 – Tom Maniatis, MD, Cambridge, Massachusetts
 2001 – Francis S. Collins, MD, PhD, Bethesda, Maryland
 2002 – David Baltimore, PhD, Pasadena, California
 2003–2009 – no listed recipients
 2010 – David L. Chadwick, MD, La Mesa, California

See also

 List of medicine awards

References
 

Medicine awards
American awards